Alexander Chagodayev (born 15 January 1981) is a Russian former professional ice hockey forward.

Career 
Chagodayev played in the Russian Superleague for Salavat Yulaev Ufa, Lokomotiv Yaroslavl, Lada Togliatti, Molot-Prikamye Perm and Vityaz Chekhov. He was drafted 105th overall in the 1999 NHL Entry Draft by the Mighty Ducks of Anaheim.

References

External links

1981 births
Living people
HC Lada Togliatti players
Lokomotiv Yaroslavl players
Anaheim Ducks draft picks
Molot-Prikamye Perm players
Russian ice hockey forwards
Salavat Yulaev Ufa players
HC Vityaz players
Sportspeople from Perm, Russia